José Silvano Puente Larrosa (born April 10, 1968 in Montevideo, Uruguay) is a former Uruguayan footballer and current coach. He played in several clubs of Uruguay, Paraguay, Chile and Ecuador.

Teams
  Central Español 1983–1986
  Liverpool 1987–1995
  Cobreloa 1996–1998
  Olimpia 1999
  Liga Deportiva Universitaria de Quito 2000
  Liverpool 2001
  Cerro 2002
  Central Español 2003–2007
  Racing Club de Montevideo 2007

References
 
 Profile at Football Lineups
 
 

1968 births
Living people
Uruguayan footballers
Uruguayan expatriate footballers
Uruguayan football managers
Liverpool F.C. (Montevideo) players
Racing Club de Montevideo players
C.A. Cerro players
Central Español players
Club Olimpia footballers
L.D.U. Quito footballers
Cobreloa footballers
Chilean Primera División players
Expatriate footballers in Chile
Expatriate footballers in Ecuador
Expatriate footballers in Paraguay
Uruguayan expatriate sportspeople in Ecuador
Association football defenders
Liverpool F.C. (Montevideo) managers
Boston River managers
C.A. Cerro managers
Juventud de Las Piedras managers